Belén (Aroma) is a small town in Bolivia. In 2010 it had an estimated population of 643.

References

Populated places in La Paz Department (Bolivia)